Mark Harold Holzemer (born August 20, 1969, in Littleton, Colorado) is an American former professional baseball pitcher.

Career
Drafted by the California Angels in the 4th round of the 1987 Major League Baseball Draft, Holzemer made his Major League Baseball debut with the California Angels on August 21, and appeared in his final game on August 13, . In , he played for the Yokohama BayStars (in Japan)  Holzemer won 2 games in the major leagues and on July 23, 1997, he picked up the only save of his MLB career. Holzemer retired the last batter of the game to close out a 6-3 Mariners victory over the Indians.

Mark and his wife, Liz Holzemer, a meningioma survivor, appeared on an episode of Mystery Diagnosis on the Discovery Health Channel.

Mark is currently the owner of Slammers Baseball in Lakewood, Colorado, where he also works as an instructor. He is also currently employed as an Associate Scout for the Kansas City Royals organization.

References

External links

Pelota Binaria (Venezuelan Winter League)
Slammers Baseball - Company owned by Mark Holzemer
Liz Holzemer's Homepage

1969 births
Living people
American expatriate baseball players in Canada
American expatriate baseball players in Japan
Baseball players from Colorado
Bend Bucks players
California Angels players
Colorado Springs Sky Sox players
Edmonton Trappers players
Lake Elsinore Storm players
Major League Baseball pitchers
Midland Angels players
Naranjeros de Hermosillo players
American expatriate baseball players in Mexico
Navegantes del Magallanes players
American expatriate baseball players in Venezuela
Nippon Professional Baseball pitchers
Oakland Athletics players
Palm Springs Angels players
Sportspeople from Littleton, Colorado
Philadelphia Phillies players
Quad Cities Angels players
Reading Phillies players
Scranton/Wilkes-Barre Red Barons players
Seattle Mariners players
Tacoma Rainiers players
Tigres de Aragua players
Tucson Sidewinders players
Vancouver Canadians players
Yokohama BayStars players